Magnet is the pseudonym of Norwegian singer-songwriter Even Johansen (born 7 June 1970). To date, he has released five full-length studio albums as well as several singles and EPs. Johansen draws upon many influences, including folk, pop, and electronica. His albums are composed and produced solely by him, and he usually performs live sets on his own, using preset loops or creating them as he plays.

Biography
Even Johansen was born, raised, and resides in Bergen, Norway, but he has also lived just outside the southern Scottish town of Lockerbie, where he recorded his On Your Side album. Initially, Even was a founding member of the Norwegian rock bands Libido and Chocolate Overdose. During his involvement with Libido, Even conceived a series of songs he thought were inappropriate for the band. His first solo album, Quiet & Still, was released in 2000 under the alias Magnet (in the United States, the album was released under his real name). The name "Magnet" originated from when Even was a child with anemia; he was prescribed a special magnetic tattoo on his left shoulder so it could attract iron.

Magnet's second album On Your Side was released in June 2003 on Ultimate Dilemma to positive critical acclaim. The album features Magnet's duet with Irish singer-songwriter Gemma Hayes on a cover of Bob Dylan's "Lay Lady Lay", which was later featured in the 2005 film Mr. & Mrs. Smith. Following European and North American tour dates throughout 2003 and 2004, Magnet signed to Atlantic Records for his third album The Tourniquet, which was released in May 2005 to further positive acclaim. In 2006, he contributed several songs to the soundtrack of the video game Dreamfall: The Longest Journey. His fourth studio album, The Simple Life, followed in March 2007 on the Hermetix Recordings label, an imprint of Sony BMG.

Over the years, Even has toured with Phoenix, Engineers, Zero 7, Isobel Campbell, Gemma Hayes, Ed Harcourt, Stars, and Doves. Even also provided a remix of Doves' song "The Last Broadcast," which was featured on the bonus disc of their 2003 B-sides and rarities compilation Lost Sides.

On 16 July 2011, Even posted a new single to his Myspace page entitled "Doldrum Days", and followed it with his fifth and latest album at that date on 2 December 2011. The album, Ferrofluid, was released in Norway through iTunes and other retailers.

Discography

Albums
Quiet & Still (10 October 2000)
On Your Side (23 June 2003)
The Tourniquet (30 May 2005)
The Simple Life (26 March 2007)
Ferrofluid (2 December 2011)

Singles/EPs
Where Happiness Lives EP (3 June 2002) (CD, 10")
 "Where Happiness Lives"
 "I'll Come Along"
 "Heaviest Heart"
 "Nothing Hurts Now"
Chasing Dreams EP (23 September 2002) (CD, 10")
 "Chasing Dreams"
 "Little Miss More or Less"
 "Home Song"
 "I'll Come Along" (Psychonauts Remix)
The Day We Left Town EP (21 April 2003) (CD)
 "The Day We Left Town"
 "Clean Slate"
 "Dead Happy"
 "The Big Black Moon"
"Last Day of Summer" single (24 November 2003) (12")
 "Last Day of Summer"
 "Last Day of Summer" (Tom Middleton Cosmos Vox Remix)
 "Last Day of Summer" (Tom Middleton Cosmos Deep Dub)
"Lay Lady Lay" single (22 March 2004)
CD:
 "Lay Lady Lay" (with Gemma Hayes) (Radio Edit)
 "Wish Me Well"
 "Last Day of Summer" (Tom Middleton Cosmos Vox Remix)
 "Lay Lady Lay" (enhanced video)
7" vinyl:
 "Lay Lady Lay" (with Gemma Hayes)
 "Clean Slate" (The Bees Remix Edit)
Minus EP (29 November 2004) (Norway-only CD)
 "Let It Snow"
 "Clean Slate"
 "Heaviest Heart"
 "Dead Happy"
 "The Big Black Moon"
 "Clean Slate" (The Bees Remix)
"Hold On" (15 August 2005)
UK double 7" set:
 "Hold On"
 "The Mute"
 "The Pacemaker"
 "Good Mourning"
US Tour EP CD:
 "Hold On" (Radio Edit)
 "The Mute"
 "Good Mourning"
 "Grinder"
 "Hold On" (Metronomy Remix)
 "Hold On" (Lindstrøm Remix)
"Fall at Your Feet" (5 December 2005)
CD:
 "Fall at Your Feet" (Jack Joseph Puig Mix)
 "This Bird Can Never Fly"
7" vinyl:
 "Fall at Your Feet"
 "Hold On" (Metronomy Remix)
Dreamfall: The Longest Journey Soundtrack EP (5 April 2006)
 "Be With You" (previously unreleased)
 "My Darling Curse"
 "The Pacemaker"
 "Nothing Hurts Now"
"Lonely No More" (30 June 2008) 
 "Lonely No More"
 "Pennydrop"
 "1997"
 "Selfhelper"
"Deja Vu" (13 September 2019)
Single track, digital download only

References

External links

 Magnet's official
 Magnet's official MySpace page
 Magnet at Discogs
 Magnet on Last.fm
 Magnet on BPOP Mentometer (in Norwegian)

1970 births
Living people
Norwegian singer-songwriters
Sony BMG artists
Warner Music Group artists
21st-century Norwegian singers
21st-century Norwegian male singers